

Events
 10 February – 5 years since the last show, Ray Martin returns to the hosting role on Nine's A Current Affair.
 1 March – Before the Game premieres on Network Ten and was hosted by Dave Hughes and Peter Helliar.
 17 March – Seven launches a new news bulletin at 4:30 pm, titled Target Iraq, detailing the latest developments on the war in Iraq. After the invasion concludes, the bulletin is retained and is renamed Seven 4.30 News (later Seven Afternoon News), with production moving to Melbourne before it is moved back to Sydney in 2006, where it remains as of today.
 19 April – Rove McManus wins the 2003 TV WEEK Gold Logie.
 21 April –
Yu-Gi-Oh! premieres on Network Ten as part of Cheez TV.
The British episode of Who Wants to Be a Millionaire? in which Charles Ingram cheats his way to the top prize is shown on the Nine Network to an Australian television audience of nearly two million people.
 4 June – Mike London quits as National Nine News Brisbane weekend co-anchor after he allegedly arranged for a female fan to complain about the presenting style of then-weeknight presenter Bruce Paige.
 23 June – The Price Is Right revived on the Nine Network at 5.30pm weeknights after 5 years off the air, Larry Emdur returned as hosting and Shawn Cosgrove returned as voiceover, earlier news reports had speculated that former A*mazing host James Sherry would be the star, but it never happened.
 25 June – Neighbours producers has announced that star Delta Goodrem will not renew her contract with the Network Ten series when it expires in next month. She is expected to be seen on-air until September.
 30 June – Network Ten axes vintage episode reruns of Neighbours earlier through the 1991 series after very bad ratings, In 2002 Neighbours rated only 70,000 viewers during the whole 1990 series.
 30 June – Two of the ABC's digital television service channels ABC Kids and Fly TV closed down due to funding cuts from the Federal Government.
 1 July – TEN launches the one-hour afternoon news bulletin instead.
 1 July – Huey's Cooking Adventures moves to the 3:30 pm timeslot on Network Ten with Iain Hewitson.
 13 July – The Australian version of the Endemol-hit decision making game: Deal or No Deal, premieres on the Seven Network hosted by Weekend Sunrise host Andrew O'Keefe, offering a top prize of a staggering two million dollars before lowering the top prize to $200,000 next year.
 21 July – Regina Bird wins season 3 of Big Brother, becoming the show's first female winner.
 23 July – CSI: Miami a sequel to the American mystery fiction television series in the CSI franchise, premieres on the Nine Network and is shown every Wednesday at 8:30pm, followed American police procedural series Without a Trace at 9:30pm which also debuts on Nine on the same day.
 27 July – The Australian version of Pop Idol (known as Australian Idol) debuts on Network Ten.
 19 September – Hi-5 celebrates its 200th episode.
 28 September – Shaun Faulkner wins the fourth season of The Mole, taking home $104,000 in prize money. Petrina Edge is revealed as the Mole, and Nathan Beves is the runner-up.
 10 October – 
After protests from the community during the Vietnam War, SBS TV has chosen to cancel its broadcasts of the state-run news service across Vietnam.
 23 October – Axed-Neighbours star Delta Goodrem wins the GOLD ARIA for Single of the Year at the 2003 ARIA Awards, along with 6 trophies, including John Farnham being inducted to the Hall of Fame and blasted the speakers loud to 1985's "You're The Voice".
 19 November –  The first series of Australian Idol was won by Guy Sebastian defeating Shannon Noll, along with his very first single, Angels Brought Me Here debuting at #1 on the ARIA Top 50 singles and Video Hits Top 20 singles chart reaching 4 time Platinum and album Just as I Am debuted at #1 and was reached 6 times Platinum. In 2010, Angels Brought Me Here ranked #1 on the ARIA end of decade singles chart.
 24 November - Release date of Guy Sebastian's debut single, "Angels Brought Me Here".
 5 December – After six years of reading the news together, Ross Symonds and Ann Sanders are both sacked as presenters of Seven News Sydney following years of dismal ratings to rivals National Nine News Sydney and Ten Eyewitness News Sydney. Ian Ross replaced them as of 2004. Symonds subsequently left the network, while Sanders remains with Seven to this day, reading the national morning news and the local Sydney afternoon news.
 22 December –  Australian children's comedy series The Ferals returns to air on ABC after a very long absence since 1995. Rather than airing in the afternoons on Mondays at 5:00pm, the series now airs at 11:20am weekday mornings.
 December – Nine Network takes a new record as the network wins all 40 weeks of ratings.

Debuts

New International Programming

Changes to network affiliation
This is a list of programs which made their premiere on an Australian television network that had previously premiered on another Australian television network. The networks involved in the switch of allegiances are predominantly both free-to-air networks or both subscription television networks. Programs that have their free-to-air/subscription television premiere, after previously premiering on the opposite platform (free-to air to subscription/subscription to free-to air) are not included. In some cases, programs may still air on the original television network. This occurs predominantly with programs shared between subscription television networks.

International

Subscription television

Domestic

International

Free-to-air premieres
This is a list of programs which made their premiere on Australian free-to-air television that had previously premiered on Australian subscription television. Programs may still air on the original subscription television network.

International

Subscription premieres
This is a list of programs which made their premiere on Australian subscription television that had previously premiered on Australian free-to-air television. Programs may still air on the original free-to-air television network.

Domestic

International

Specials

Ending / Resting this year

See also
 2003 in Australia
 List of Australian films of 2003

References